Carbost (Gaelic: Càrrabost) is the name of several settlements:

Carbost, Loch Harport, Isle of Skye, in Highland, Scotland
Carbost, Trotternish, near Portree, Isle of Skye, in Highland, Scotland
Carabost, New South Wales, Australia